Mattias Marklund (born 14 September 1974) is a guitarist who plays in Vintersorg, Casket Casey, The Derelict Dead, and TME. He also did guest guitar work for Vintersorg bandmate, Andreas Hedlund's progressive rock band, Waterclime.

Discography

With Otyg

Bergtagen (demo, 1995)
I Trollskogens Drömmande Mörker (demo, 1996)
Galdersång till Bergfadern (demo, 1997)
Älvefärd (full-length, 1998)
Sagovindars Boning (full-length, 1999)

With Vintersorg

Cosmic Genesis (full-length, 2000)
Visions from the Spiral Generator (full-length, 2002)
The Focusing Blur (full-length, 2004)
Solens rötter (full-length, 2007)
Jordpuls (full-length, 2011)
Naturbål (full-length, 2014)
Till fjälls: Del II (full-length, 2017)

With Casket Casey

Coffin' up Bones (EP, 2004)

With Waterclime

The Astral Factor (full-length, 2006)

With TME

Worlds Collide (full-length, 2007)

External links
TME (dead)
Casket Casey
Vintersorg
Aphotic Records
Blood and Guts Records

1974 births
Living people
Swedish heavy metal guitarists
Black metal musicians
21st-century guitarists